Nguyet Anh Duong (Dương Nguyệt Ánh; born 1960 in Saigon) is a Vietnamese American scientist responsible for the creation of the Thermobaric weapon.

She is noted as the "Scientist who developed the bomb that ended the war with Afghanistan" by the Vietnamese American National Gala.


Biography

Early life
During  the Vietnam War, her family left their homeland on April 28, 1975, right before the Fall of Saigon

Becoming one of the Vietnamese boat people, they eventually arrived in the Philippines. From there, they were assigned to a refugee camp. Her family then contacted the Embassy of the United States, Manila and were given political asylum in the United States. She graduated from the University of Maryland, College Park with both a B.S. degree in chemical engineering and a B.S. degree in computer science.

Career
In 1983 she started working as a chemical engineer at the Indian Head Naval Surface Weapons Center. From 1991-1999, she managed all navy basic, exploratory research and advanced development programs in high explosives. She also served as the U.S. Navy focus point for explosives and the transition of Navy explosives into weapon systems, providing consultation to government/military, industries and allied nations. From 1999-2002, she managed all NSWC Indian Head's technical programs in Explosives and Undersea Weapons, from concept through engineering development to production and demilitarization.

She successfully assembled and led a team of scientists and engineers to develop a thermobaric bomb. They then proceeded to limited production and delivery to the Air Force, all in an unprecedented period of 67 days.

Nguyet Anh successfully led the development and transition of a total of 10 high-performing explosives into 18 different weapons in the past 12 years, which is an unprecedented record of its kind. She has served as a U.S. Delegate at the NATO AC310 Subgroup I for Explosives, and chairman/member of many national and international Panels/Technical Steering Groups.

Since 2002, Nguyet Anh has been the director of Science and Technology of Naval Surface Warfare Center, U.S. Department of Defense, where she was responsible for Indian Head's overall technical investment strategies, guiding and overseeing research and development programs in all areas of science and technology and focusing these efforts toward the creation of future weapon generations for the United States.

Since 2009, Duong has been the director for the Borders and Maritime Security Division within the United States Department of Homeland Security Science and Technology Directorate.

Awards
In 1999 she was awarded the Dr. Arthur E. Bisson Prize for Achievement in Naval Technology and had her name engraved in a plaque on permanent display at the Office of Naval Research. In 2001, she was awarded the Civilian Meritorious Medal for superb leadership, technical expertise and significant contributions to the Department of Defense in the area of High Performance Explosives. In 2007, she was awarded the National Security Medal for significant contribution to the nation in activities related to national security.

References

External links
Bomb Lady: Vietnamese American Makes Tools for War on Terror by Pacific News Service
Naval Surface Warfare Center, U.S. Department of Defense
 George F. Will, Anh Duong, Out Of Debt, Newsweek, Dec 17, 2007 Issue.
YouTube Award of 2007 National Security Medal
YouTube Duong Nguyet Anh part 1(of 7), English, to Youths, Sydney

Living people
People from Ho Chi Minh City
American chemical engineers
University of Maryland, College Park alumni
Vietnamese emigrants to the United States
Year of birth missing (living people)